An odontoblast process (also called Tomes's fibers or Tomes fibers, or by a dated term Tomes's fibrils) is an extension of a cell called an odontoblast, which forms dentin in a tooth. The odontoblast process is located in dentinal tubules. It forms during dentinogenesis and results from a part of the odontoblast staying in its location as the main body of the odontoblast moves toward the center of the tooth's pulp.  The odontoblast process causes the secretion of hydroxyapatite crystals and mineralization of the matrix secreted by the odontoblasts.

References

See also
Tomes's process
John Tomes

Tooth development